Neustrelitz is a town in the Mecklenburgische Seenplatte district in the state of Mecklenburg-Vorpommern, Germany. It is situated on the shore of the Zierker See in the Mecklenburg Lake District. From 1738 until 1918 it was the capital of the Duchy of Mecklenburg-Strelitz. From 1994 until 2011 it was the capital of the district of Mecklenburg-Strelitz.

The name Strelitz is derived from the Polabian word Strelci, meaning "archers" or "shooters".

History

The village of Strelitz was first mentioned in 1278. It grew to a small town in the following centuries. In the 17th century Strelitz was a part of the duchy of Mecklenburg-Güstrow, which ceased to exist after the death of the last duke in 1695. Afterwards the new Duchy of Mecklenburg-Strelitz was established (1701). This small duchy contained the present-day district and an exclave around Ratzeburg, which is today situated in Schleswig-Holstein.

In 1712 the castle and the town of Strelitz burnt down. After this disaster the duke and his family lived on their hunting lodge at the lake called Zierker See (Lake Zierke) to the northwest of Strelitz. Around this place the new town of Neustrelitz (New Strelitz) was constructed. It became the official capital of Mecklenburg-Strelitz in 1736.

Neustrelitz remained the ducal seat until 1918 and was the capital of the Free State of Mecklenburg-Strelitz from 1918 to 1933. In 1934 it was merged with Mecklenburg-Schwerin to the Gau of Mecklenburg.

The ancient town of Strelitz continued to exist after the fire of 1712; it was a small village, which was suburbanised by Neustrelitz in 1931.

When the Red Army troops of the 2nd Belorussian Front entered the town on 30 April 1945, 681 people committed suicide.

Sights and monuments

The city centre is characterised by Baroque architecture. Its heart is the Marktplatz (Market Square), with the Stadtkirche (city church), built in 1768–1778 and the opposite Rathaus (Town Hall), built in 1841 by Friedrich W. Buttel, a disciple of Karl Friedrich Schinkel.

The Baroque Neustrelitz Palace was destroyed in 1945, but the palace gardens (Schloßgarten) still exist. Worth seeing are the 18th-century Orangerie (from orange), initially used as a summerhouse, the Schloßkirche (Palace Church) built in 1855–1859 in English Neo-Gothic style, the Neoclassic Hebe temple (with a replica of a statue of the goddess Hebe), and the Louise Temple, built in 1891 in the shape of a Greek temple to house the tomb of Queen Louise of Prussia, born Princess of Mecklenburg-Strelitz.

There is a small lake, Glambeck See, where one can swim in summer in a protected area and have lunch at a restaurant overlooking the lake.

Transport
The town has a station on the Berlin Northern railway and provides direct connections to Berlin and Rostock.

Entertainment
The city has hosted the popular Immergut Festival since the year 2000, attended by almost 5000 visitors each year.

Neustrelitz boasts its own theatre with a permanent resident cast. Drama, operas, operettas and musicals are regularly performed there. The theatre seats 400 persons. A review (in German) of a 2017 opera performance of Offenbach´s The Tales of Hoffmann is to be found here. www.myway.de/hoffmann/1617-neustrelitz.html

Notable people 

 Thomas Böttger (born 1957), composer and pianist
 Andreas Dittmer (born 1972), Olympian winner in canoeing
 Carl Eggers (1787–1863), artist painter
 Rainer Ernst (born 1961), footballer
 Mark Frank (athlete) (born 1977), javelin thrower
 Ulf Hoffmann (born 1961), gymnast
 Bernhard Horwitz (1807–1885), chess master
 Charly Hübner (born 1972), actor
 Wilhelm von Kardorff (1828-1907), landowner and politician 
 Karl Kraepelin (1848–1915), biologist, founder of the Natural History Museum in Hamburg
 Emil Kraepelin (1856–1926), psychiatrist, considered as father of modern psychiatry
 Hans Kundt (1869–1939), German-Bolivian general in the First World War and the Chacokrieg
 Marie Kundt (1870–1932), photographer, teacher and director of the Photographische Lehranstalt der Lette-Verein Berlin
 Otto Piper (1882–1946), jurist and politician (DVP)
 Jesco von Puttkamer (1919–1987), publicist
 Franz Rademacher (1906–1973), jurist
 Carl Friedrich Roewer (1881–1963), pedagogue, arachnologist and museum director
 Prince Carl of Solms-Braunfels (1812–1875), German prince and military officer in both the Austrian army and in the cavalry of the Grand Duchy of Hesse, and also founder of the settlement New Braunfels, Comal County, Texas (USA)
 Herbert Wagner (born 1948), politician (CDU), Lord Mayor of Dresden 1990–2001
 Olaf Winter (born 1973), Olympian winner in canoeing
 Albert Wolff (sculptor) (1814–1892), sculptor

International relations

Twin towns – Sister cities
Neustrelitz is twinned with:
 Chaykovsky, Russia
 Szczecinek, Poland
 Rovaniemi, Finland
 Schwäbisch Hall, Germany

References

External links

Cities and towns in Mecklenburg
Populated places established in 1733
Grand Duchy of Mecklenburg-Strelitz